Şirvan Kürdəmir FK was an Azerbaijani football club from Şilyan founded in 1990, and dissolved in 1994.

League and domestic cup history

References 

Sirvan Kurdemir
Association football clubs established in 1990
Defunct football clubs in Azerbaijan
Association football clubs disestablished in 1992